Programmed cell death protein 6 is a protein that in humans is encoded by the PDCD6 gene.

This gene encodes a calcium-binding protein belonging to the penta-EF-hand protein family. Calcium binding is important for homodimerization and for conformational changes required for binding to other protein partners. This gene product participates in T cell receptor-, Fas-, and glucocorticoid-induced programmed cell death. In mice deficient for this gene product, however, apoptosis was not blocked suggesting this gene product is functionally redundant.

Interactions
PDCD6 has been shown to interact with ASK1, PDCD6IP, Fas receptor, ANXA11 and PEF1.

References

Further reading

External links
 
 

Penta-EF-hand proteins